Mary Lovenia DeConge-Watson (born 1933) is an American mathematician and former nun as part of the Order of the Sisters of the Holy Family. She was the 15th African-American woman to earn her Ph.D. in mathematics.

Early life and education
DeConge-Watson was born in 1933 in Wickliff, Louisiana as the seventh of nine children of Adina Rodney DeConge and Alphonse Frank DeConge.  She joined the Sisters of the Holy Family at age 16, later becoming a nun in the Holy Order of the Sisters of Saint Francis. Between 1952 and 1955, Deconge taught elementary school in parochial schools in Baton Rouge and Lafayette.  She then attended Seton Hill College where she studied mathematics and French (with minors in English, psychology, and history) and was the second Black student to attend the school.

After graduating from Seton Hall in 1959, Deconge-Watson taught French and math at Holy Ghost School in Opelousas, Louisiana, until 1961.

In 1962, DeConge-Watson received a master's degree in mathematics from Louisiana State University.  She opted to take a break from her studies and teach at DeLisle Junior College in New Orleans from 1963 - 1964.  She then started her PhD studies Tulane University, studying there for one semester.

Although delayed by a long illness in the midst of her graduate career, in 1968, DeConge-Watson received her Ph.D. in mathematics and a minor in French from St. Louis University for her dissertation 2-Normed Lattices and 2-Metric Spaces.

Career
While in graduate school, DeConge-Watson worked as a teacher at Holy Ghost High School in Opelousas, Louisiana and DeLilse Junior College in New Orleans. After receiving her Ph.D. she worked as an assistant professor of mathematics at Loyola University New Orleans from 1968 to 1971.  In 1971 she became an assistant professor at Southern University in Baton Rouge. In 1982, she became a full professor and was appointed Chair of the Department of Mathematics at Southern University in 1986.

DeConge-Watson spent many years training elementary school teachers for their math competency exams.  She wrote an unpublished text as part of the training program.

DeConge-Watson served as the director of the Center for Minorities in Science, Engineering, and Technology at Southern University and the A&M College System from 1995 - 1998.  Following a short retirement, she returned to Southern University in various positions before entering a complete retirement in 2004.

DeConge-Watson has had her work published in Proceedings of the National Academy of Sciences, The Notices of the American Mathematical Society, and the Journal of Mathematical Analytical Applications.  She is known for her publications related to Cauchy's Problem for Higher-Order Abstract Parabolic Equations.

Personal life
DeConge-Watson left the religious order in 1976. She married Roy Watson Sr in 1983.

References

External links
Biography in The History Makers.

1933 births
Living people
20th-century American mathematicians
American women mathematicians
African-American mathematicians
Saint Louis University mathematicians
Seton Hill University alumni
Louisiana State University alumni
Saint Louis University alumni
20th-century women mathematicians
20th-century African-American women
20th-century African-American people
21st-century African-American people
21st-century African-American women